Beneath the Mask is an album by Chick Corea Elektric Band, released in 1991 through the record label GRP. The album peaked at number two on Billboard Top Contemporary Jazz Albums chart.

Track listing 
 "Beneath the Mask" (Chick Corea, John Patitucci, Dave Weckl) – 3:31 			
 "Little Things That Count" (John Patitucci, Dave Weckl) – 3:47 			
 "One of Us Is Over 40" (Chick Corea, John Patitucci, Dave Weckl) – 4:55 			
 "A Wave Goodbye" (Chick Corea, Dave Weckl) – 4:45 			
 "Lifescape" (Chick Corea) – 5:10 			
 "Jammin E. Cricket" (Chick Corea, John Patitucci, Dave Weckl) – 6:51 			
 "Charged Particles" (Chick Corea) – 5:17 			
 "Free Step" (Chick Corea) – 7:44 			
 "99 Flavors" (Chick Corea) – 3:52 			
 "Illusions" (Chick Corea, John Patitucci, Dave Weckl) – 9:44

Personnel 
 Chick Corea – keyboards
 Frank Gambale – guitars
 John Patitucci – basses
 Dave Weckl – drums
 Eric Marienthal – saxophones

Additional musicians
 Bob Rice – synthesizer programming 
 Rory Kaplan – synth string bass 

Production
 Chick Corea – producer, mixing, cover concept 
 John Patitucci – co-producer
 Dave Weckl – co-producer, mixing
 Dave Grusin – executive producer
 Ron Moss – executive producer, cover concept, cover design, lettering 
 Larry Rosen – executive producer
 Danny Byrnes – recording manager 
 Bernie Kirsh – recording, mixing
 Robert Read – assistant engineer
 Wally Traugott – mastering at Capitol Studios (Hollywood, California)
 Joseph Doughney – post-production engineer 
 Michael Landy – post-production engineer 
 Kim Barry – equipment technician 
 Mick Thompson – keyboard and Synclavier technician 
 Brian Alexander – Rhodes piano technician 
 Mark Frankovich – studio manager 
 Evelyn Brechtlein – project coordinator
 Andy Baltimore – creative director
 Mike Manoogian – cover design, graphic design, lettering 
 David Gibb – graphic design
 Scott Johnson – graphic design
 Sonny Mediana – graphic design
 Andy Ruggirello – graphic design
 Dan Serrano – graphic design
 Barton Stabler – cover illustration 
 Harrison Funk – photography

Chart performance

References 

1991 albums
Chick Corea albums
GRP Records albums